The M class is a series of 10 container ships built for OOCL with a maximum theoretical capacity of 13,208 TEU. The ships were built by Samsung Heavy Industries in South Korea. Construction started in 2012 and the first ship was delivered in 2013.

The original order was for just 6 ships and was signed in April 2011. Two months later it was announced that four additional ships would be ordered. They would be chartered to NYK Line for a length of three years. After the charter ended the ships were renamed and they have since become a part of the OOCL fleet.

List of ships

See also 

 G-class container ship

References 

Container ship classes
Ships built by Samsung Heavy Industries
Ships of the Orient Overseas Container Line